The 1973 Czechoslovak presidential election took place on 22 March 1973. Ludvík Svoboda was elected for his second term.

Background
Svoboda was the president since 1968. His first term expired in 1973. He was nominated as the only candidate.

References

Presidential
1973
Single-candidate elections
Elections in Communist Czechoslovakia